Lis Frost (born 11 November 1961) is a Swedish cross-country skier who competed from 1986 to 1997. Competing in three Winter Olympics, she earned her best overall finish of sixth in the 4 × 5 km relay at Calgary in 1988 and her best individual finish of 28th in the 30 km event at Lillehammer in 1994.

Frost's best finish at the FIS Nordic World Ski Championships was tenth in the 10 km event at Val di Fiemme in 1991. Her best World Cup career finish was fifth in a 30 km event in East Germany in 1989

Cross-country skiing results
All results are sourced from the International Ski Federation (FIS).

Olympic Games

World Championships

World Cup

Season standings

Team podiums

 1 victory
 2 podiums

References

External links

Women's 4 x 5 km cross-country relay Olympic results: 1976-2002 

1961 births
Living people
Swedish female cross-country skiers
Cross-country skiers at the 1988 Winter Olympics
Cross-country skiers at the 1992 Winter Olympics
Cross-country skiers at the 1994 Winter Olympics
Olympic cross-country skiers of Sweden
People from Strömsund Municipality